Nosazi Madares Hamedan Football Club is an Iranian football club based in Hamedan, Iran. They currently compete in the 2011–12 Hazfi Cup.

Season-by-Season

The table below shows the achievements of the club in various competitions.

See also
 2011–12 Hazfi Cup

Football clubs in Iran
Association football clubs established in 2007
2007 establishments in Iran